Ladylands Platform railway station co-served the village of Kippen, Stirling, Scotland, from 1861 to 1934 on the Forth and Clyde Junction Railway.

History 
The station was opened as Ladylands Siding in June 1861 by the Forth and Clyde Junction Railway, although there is evidence of it being used earlier on 25 June 1858 for Balgair Fair. As well as being a passenger station, it was also a farm siding, hence its original name. The siding was to the north. To the north side of the line was a railway crossing. The station's name was changed to Ladylands Platform on 11 July 1927. It closed on 1 October 1934.

References 

Disused railway stations in Stirlingshire
Railway stations in Great Britain opened in 1861
Railway stations in Great Britain closed in 1934
1861 establishments in Scotland
1934 disestablishments in Scotland